The Hispanic Society of America operates a museum and reference library for the study of the arts and cultures of Spain and Portugal and their former colonies in Latin America, the Spanish East Indies, and Portuguese India. Despite the name, it has never functioned as a learned society.

Founded in 1904 by philanthropist Archer M. Huntington, the institution continues to operate at its original location in a 1908 Beaux Arts building on Audubon Terrace in the Washington Heights neighborhood of New York City. A second building, on the north side of the terrace, was added in 1930. Exterior sculpture in front of that building includes work by Anna Hyatt Huntington and nine major reliefs by the Swiss-American sculptor Berthold Nebel, a commission that took ten years to complete. The Hispanic Society complex was designated as a National Historic Landmark in 2012. In 2021, the museum expanded into the former home of the Museum of the American Indian, adjacent to the museum's original building.

Collections
The museum contains more than 18,000 works in every medium, ranging from prehistoric times to the 20th century. The collection includes important paintings by Diego Velázquez, Francisco de Goya, El Greco, and Joaquín Sorolla, among others. It also includes sculpture and architectural elements, furniture and metalwork, ceramics and textiles.

The Sorolla Room, which was reinstalled in 2010, displays Vision of Spain, 14 massive paintings commissioned by Archer Huntington in 1911. Sorolla completed these works from 1913 to 1919. These paintings total more than 200 linear feet (61 m); they ring the large room and depict scenes from the regions of Spain.

The library contains more than 250,000 books; 200,000 documents; 175,000 photographs; and 15,000 prints. The rare books library maintains 15,000 books printed before 1700, including a first edition of Don Quijote. It also holds the manuscript Black Book of Hours, Horae Beatae Virginis Mariae ad usum Romanum (circa 1458), one of only a handful of such works, and the enormous Map of the World (1526) by Juan Vespucio.

The society has been described as "perhaps New York's most misunderstood institution", because it was established to concentrate on Old Spain and its culture in its colonies, as opposed to Hispanic American culture, despite its location in what has over time become a predominantly Hispanic (chiefly Dominican) neighborhood. In 2012 it was suggested that the museum (although not the society) be renamed the "Archer M. Huntington Museum of Art" to clarify this distinction, but the name change was never pursued.

The creation of a historic museum
During the late 19th century in America, sentiments towards the country's relationship with Spain were negative. This is mainly due to the fact that during the 16th to 17th centuries, Spain had set its sights on dominating most of North and South America. Therefore, by the 18th century, the United States viewed Spain as an enemy that must be dealt with in order to move forward with American success in North America. During the 19th century, many areas once under Spanish control in North America were added to the territories of the United States. By the turn of the 19th century into the 20th century, Hispanic and Latin American studies became more pronounced in the scholarly world in the United States. Huntington's Hispanic Society of America was one of the leaders in the movement to bring Hispanic art to the attention of scholars in order to introduce the concept that Hispanic art was worthy of study. People started to realize that learning about Hispanic culture was important because it was such a large part of American history. Huntington had the foresight to see how important this kind of museum would be and established the museum in 1904.

Huntington worked diligently in collecting a vast amount of Hispanic art in order to put together the museum. In fact, he did not stop at art. He collected Hispanic heritage items, literature, and around 40,000 books which formed an enormous library used as a resource for scholars who study Hispanic history, literature, art, and culture to this day. Hence, his idea for the institution was not narrowly for showing paintings, sculptures, and historical artifacts, but more widely for it to be used as a center for research and scholarly study.

As for the design of the building, Huntington had a large role in the design and creation of the institution itself. The main building was based on the designs of Huntington's cousin, Charles P. Huntington. Huntington desired Audubon Terrace to become a complex of cultural institutions, which was partially realized. The chosen neoclassical design of the complex was designed to become the reputable institution that the Hispanic Society of America is today.

Expansion and renovations
In April 2015 the society announced the appointment of Philippe de Montebello to chair the society's Board of Overseers and spearhead a major effort to roughly double the museum's size by renovating the vacant Beaux Arts building adjacent to the society's original museum building. It was formerly used by the Museum of the American Indian, which had moved years before to the former U.S. Custom House in lower Manhattan.

Beginning January 1, 2017, the museum was closed for extensive renovations, although the library was open on a limited basis by appointment only. The $15 million project will replace the building's roof and lighting. Originally scheduled to reopen in the fall of 2019, the main museum is still closed as of early 2022, but the new East Building Gallery, formerly the Museum of the American Indian, was opened in 2021 for rotating exhibitions.

While the museum was closed, many of its works were lent to other institutions. About 200 of the society's most important works were displayed from April through September 2017 at the Museo del Prado in Madrid. The exhibit traveled to the Museo del Palacio de Bellas Artes in Mexico City from June through September 2018; the Albuquerque Museum of Art and History, November 2018 through March 2019; the Cincinnati Art Museum, October 2019 through January 2020; and the Museum of Fine Arts, Houston from March to May 2020.

Admission to the museum has always been free, in accordance with Archer Huntington's trust. Due to financial difficulties, the society went to court in 2016 in order to be allowed to charge an admission fee to temporary exhibitions to be held in the museum's new facility, while keeping the main hall free. As of 2022, admission to the new galleries is free.

In 2020 the museum appointed Guillaume Kientz, former curator at the Louvre and the Kimbell Art Museum, as its new director.

Notable people
Georgiana Goddard King (1871–1939), Hispanist and medievalist
Mildred Stapley Byne (1875–1941), early curator of architecture and applied arts
Clara Louisa Penney (1888-1970), early curator of rare books and manuscripts, Society member
Florence Lewis May (1899-1988), early curator of textiles
Elizabeth du Gué Trapier (1893-1974), early curator of paintings and drawings
Alice Wilson Frothingham (1902-1976), early curator of ceramics
Beatrice Gilman Proske (1899-2002), early curator of sculpture
Eleanor Sherman Font (1896-1982), early curator of prints 
Ruth Matilda Anderson (1893-1983), early curator of photographs and curator of costumes

See also
Hispanism
Hispanist
List of National Historic Landmarks in New York City
National Register of Historic Places listings in Manhattan above 110th Street
Beatrice Gilman Proske

References

Further reading
  (20 volumes, arranged alphabetically by author)
  (fulltext)

External links

A Collection in Context: The Hispanic Society of America by the Media Center for Art History, Columbia University (includes a virtual tour of the museum)

Washington Heights, Manhattan
Art museums established in 1904
Libraries in Manhattan
Society museums in New York (state)
Art museums and galleries in New York City
Museums in Manhattan
Latino museums in the United States
Hispanic and Latino American culture in New York City
Portuguese-American culture in New York City
Spanish-American culture in New York City
1904 establishments in New York City
 
National Historic Landmarks in Manhattan
Buildings and structures on the National Register of Historic Places in Manhattan
Ethnic museums in New York City
Spanish art